Orcslayer is a sourcebook for Steve Jackson's Man to Man and later GURPS.

Contents
Orcslayer includes nine combat scenarios, each linked by role-playing encounters, in which the player characters deal with the Orcmen invading Caithness.

Publication history
Orcslayer: A Combat Supplement for Man to Man was written by Warren Spector and Steve Jackson, and was published by Steve Jackson Games in 1985 as a 48-page book.

Orcslayer followed soon after Man to Man (1985) - the first GURPS product - and introduced the fantasy world of Yrth, which would be used in later GURPS fantasy supplements.

Reception

Reviews
Different Worlds #43.

References

Fantasy role-playing game adventures
GURPS 1st/2nd edition
Orcslayer
Role-playing game supplements introduced in 1985
Yrth